Rubén González Alves (born 7 September 1994) is a Spanish professional footballer who plays for Racing de Santander. Mainly a central defender, he can also play as a left back.

Club career
Born in Rio de Janeiro to a Basque father and a Brazilian mother, González moved to Bilbao, Biscay, Basque Country at nine months of age and was a Santutxu FC youth graduate. After making his senior debut in 2013, he went on to become a regular starter for the side in Tercera División before signing for Segunda División B side SD Amorebieta on 1 July 2015.

On 25 June 2017, González agreed to a two-year contract with Barakaldo CF, also in the third division. An immediate first-choice, he moved to fellow league team CD Atlético Baleares on 14 July 2018.

On 19 July 2019, González joined UD Ibiza still in division three, on a 1+1 deal. He renewed his contract for a further year on 9 August 2020, and helped the club in their first-ever promotion to Segunda División at the end of the campaign; he extended his link for a further year on 30 June 2021.

González made his professional debut at the age of 26 on 13 August 2021, starting in a 0–0 away draw against Real Zaragoza. On 14 June of the following year, he signed a two-year contract with Racing de Santander, recently promoted to the second division.

References

External links
 
 

1994 births
Living people
Footballers from Rio de Janeiro (city)
Spanish footballers
Brazilian footballers
Spanish people of Brazilian descent
Brazilian people of Basque descent
Association football defenders
Segunda División players
Segunda División B players
Tercera División players
SD Amorebieta footballers
Barakaldo CF footballers
CD Atlético Baleares footballers
UD Ibiza players
Racing de Santander players
Footballers from Bilbao
Santutxu FC players